Abetone was a comune (municipality) in the Province of Pistoia in the Italian region of Tuscany, located about  northwest of Florence and about  northwest of Pistoia.  It has been a frazione of Abetone Cutigliano since 2017.

History 
Abetone (in Italian: "large fir") was created as a custom post on the main road from the Grand Duchy of Tuscany and the Duchy of Modena, founded in 1732. The name derives from that of a large tree cut down to allow the construction to proceed.

Starting from the early 20th century, it became a popular skiing resort. Zeno Colò, an Italian skier, was born here in 1920.

Abetone served as the finish of the 5th Stage of the 2015 Giro d'Italia.

Main sights 
 Orto Botanico Forestale dell'Abetone, a botanical garden
 Monumento Internazionale alla Pace, a monument to peace

References

External links 
 
Abetone Tourist Web Portal 

Cities and towns in Tuscany